Francisco Antonio Camassa (1588–1646) was an Italian Jesuit scholar who taught at the Colegio Imperial de Madrid.

17th-century Italian Jesuits
1588 births
1646 deaths